Plaxhaplous was a genus of glyptodont, an extinct relative of the modern armadillo. It lived in the Pleistocene epoch. The type species is Plaxhaplous canaliculatus. Plaxhaplous canaliculatus fossils were found in Argentina, near Luján in Buenos Aires Province. Plaxhaplous fossils have also been found in Uruguay. and in the Charana Formation of Bolivia.

Description 
Like all glyptodonts, Plaxhaplous was endowed with a carapace. This carapace was formed by bony osteoderms, which formed a rigid and robust structure which protected the animal from predators.

Etymology 
The name Plaxhaplous means simple, flat surface.

References 

Prehistoric cingulates
Prehistoric placental genera
Pleistocene xenarthrans
Pleistocene mammals of South America
Ensenadan
Uquian
Pleistocene Argentina
Fossils of Argentina
Pleistocene Bolivia
Fossils of Bolivia
Pleistocene Uruguay
Fossils of Uruguay
Fossil taxa described in 1884
Taxa named by Florentino Ameghino